Saadullah Khan (born 4 June 1994) is a Pakistani footballer who plays as an attacking midfielder for SSGC F.C. and the Pakistan national team. Although his favored position is that of a playmaker, he can also be deployed as a striker or winger. Khan is considered to be one of the Pakistan's best young players, possessing speed, technique, dribbling skills, and play-making capabilities. Best player 2017. Best player 2019.

Career

Youth career 
In 2008, Saadullah trained at Youth Academy Pishin. After a year, he made played for Pak Elektron.

Senior career 
He played for Khan Research Laboratories between 2011 and 2014, winning the Pakistan Premier League title in 2011–12, 2012–13, 2013–14 and Challenge Cup in 2011 and 2012, and was a member of the team which reached the 2013 AFC President's Cup final. He then had a brief stint at
Sui Southern Gas in the second-tier of Pakistani football league before finally making his move to BG Sports Club joining the club on a six-month contract in Maldives in April 2015.

In 2016, Saadullah got an offer from Hungarian team Somos Sport Egyesu KFT to play in 3 friendlies. In February 2019, he got an offer from Liga 1 club Persib Bandung.

International

Khan was first selected for the Pakistan national football team in 2014, at the age of 19. He made his debut in a 3–1 defeat against Lebanon. Khan scored his first international goal for national team against Afghanistan in 2015 which was assisted by team captain Hassan Bashir.

2009: U-20 World Cup qualify round Qatar & Iran.

2011: U-20 World Cup qualify round Iran.

2012: AFC president cup 1st round Tajikistan.

2013: U-23 friendly games with Palestine.

2013: AFC president cup 1st round Philippine.

2014: national senior team friendly game in Lebanon.

2014: national senior game with Palestine.

2014: AFC president cup Sri Lanka.

2014: FIFA friendly match against Afghanistan.

2014: Asian games in Korea.

2015: FIFA friendly games in Malaysia.

2015: FIFA friendly games in Thailand.

2015: World Cup qualify round in Qatar.

2015: World Cup qualify round in Bahrain.

2015: AFC qualifiers in UAE.

Career statistics

Club

1Asian competitions include the AFC President's Cup

International

International goals
 Scores and results table list Pakistan's goal tally first.

Honours

Club
Khan Research Laboratories
Pakistan Premier League: 2011–12, 2012–13, 2013–14;
Challenge Cup: 2011, 2012
AFC President's Cup Runner-up: 2013

References

External links

 Pakistan national team profile
 
 

1994 births
Living people
People from Pishin District
Pakistani footballers
Pakistani expatriate footballers
Pakistani expatriate sportspeople in the Maldives
Expatriate footballers in the Maldives
Association football midfielders
Pakistan international footballers
Pashtun people
SSGC F.C. players